The Equestrian Individual Championship Test Grade IV event at the 2016 Summer Paralympics was held in the Olympic Equestrian Centre on 14 September .

The competition was assessed by a ground jury composed of five judges placed at locations designated E, H, C, M, and B. Each judge rated the competitors' performances with a percentage score. The five scores from the jury were then averaged to determine a rider's total percentage score.

The event was won by Sophie Wells representing .

Results

References

Individual championship test grade IV